Joseph Marshall Walker (July 1, 1784 – January 20, 1856) was a Louisiana soldier and politician and the 13th Governor of Louisiana, from 1850 to 1853.  He is best known for being the first Governor inaugurated in the new state capital building in Baton Rouge.

Early life 
Walker was born in the French Quarter of New Orleans, Louisiana in July, 1786 when Louisiana was a colony of Spain. Walker was the son of English immigrant Peter Walker and Charlotte Constance Revoil, a second-generation Louisiana creole woman. He married Catherine Carter of Adams County, Mississippi, in the mid-1810s, and together they had twelve children.

In 1807, Walker went to Mexico and joined the Spanish army, serving as a lieutenant of dragoons, and later becoming master of a military school at Chihuahua.

After the outbreak of the War of 1812 he returned to New Orleans and enlisted in the Louisiana State Militia where he fought against the British in the Battle of New Orleans at Chalmette, Louisiana.

Political career
A member of the Democratic Party, Walker was first elected to public office in 1820, as a member of the House of Representatives of Louisiana.

On January 22, 1822, he was promoted to brigadier general of the First Brigade of the State Militia, serving concurrently with his role as a member of the state house.

Walker was reelected to the legislature three times—in 1822, 1832, and 1836. He was active in promoting the State Militia, and was credited with improving the organization and discipline of that force.

In 1846 he served as State Treasurer.

In 1849 he ran for Governor, winning against split Whig opposition from General Alexander De Clouet and Duncan F. Kenner. On 28 January 1850, he became the first governor inaugurated in the new state capital at Baton Rouge.

As governor, he established a free public school system for white children.

There was widespread opposition to the 1846 State Constitution, and in 1852, a convention elected to adopt a new one.  Walker strongly objected to this document, and, as a result, he subsequently resigned his position the following year, retiring to a family plantation in Rapides Parish. He turned down offers from Democratic Party officials to be their candidate for the United States House of Representatives.  Joseph Marshall Walker died three years later in 1856 and is buried on his plantation.

References

 Sobel, Robert, and John Raimo, eds. Biographical Directory of the Governors of the United States, 1789–1978, Vol. 2, Westport, Conn.; Meckler Books, 1978. 4 vols.
State of Louisiana - Biography

1784 births
1856 deaths
Speakers of the Louisiana House of Representatives
Democratic Party members of the Louisiana House of Representatives
Democratic Party governors of Louisiana
Politicians from New Orleans
American people of English descent
Louisiana Creole people
American people of the Mexican–American War
19th-century American politicians
Expatriates from the United States in New Spain